Ballet Shoes is British television adaptation of Noel Streatfeild's novel Ballet Shoes first broadcast on BBC One in 1975. Adapted by John Wiles and directed by Timothy Combe, the series was aired in six parts on Sunday evenings. It was aired by PBS in the United States on 27 December 1976.

Cast 

Elizabeth Morgan as Pauline Fossil
Sarah Prince as Posy Fossil
Jane Slaughter as Petrova Fossil
Barbara Lott as Nana
Angela Thorne as Sylvia Brown
Mary Morris as Madame Fidolia
Patrick Godfrey as Sir Donald Houghton
Terence Skelton as Mr Simpson
Sheila Keith as Dr Jakes
Joanna David as Theo Danes
Samantha Clogg as Winifred Bagnall

Awards 
Ballet Shoes was awarded a BAFTA for Light Entertainment for producer John McRae in 1976. In 1977 Ballet Shoes was awarded an Emmy for Outstanding Children's Special.

References

External links 
 
 

1970s British children's television series
1975 British television series debuts
BBC children's television shows
English-language television shows
1975 British television series endings